In some stock markets, the Mark Twain effect is the phenomenon of stock returns in October being lower than in other months. The name comes from a line in Mark Twain's Pudd'nhead Wilson: "October. This is one of the peculiarly dangerous months to speculate in stocks. The others are July, January, September, April, November, May, March, June, December, August, and February."

The quotation is a sarcastic assertion that speculation in stocks is always dangerous. The fact that Twain specifically picks out October initially is taken as a reference to an "October effect", as exemplified by the 1929, 1987 and 2008 stock market crashes which roughly occurred in October.

See also 
January effect

References

Stock market
Calendar effect